This is a list of the 87 members of the European Parliament for Italy in the 1999 to 2004 session.

List

Notes

Italy
List
1999